Allen v. Milligan (Dockets 21–1086, 21–1087) is a pending United States Supreme Court case related to redistricting under the Voting Rights Act of 1965.

Background 

Alabama's congressional districts have had roughly the same configuration since 1993, with one majority-minority district out of its seven total districts. Data from the 2020 United States Census showed that while the state did not gain or lose any representation at the federal level, the racial diversity in the state had increased, with the portion of white residents having fallen from 68% to 64% over the prior ten years, while Alabama's Black population grew by 3.8 percent over the same period. In November 2021, the Alabama Legislature modified the existing districts to account for shifts in population. Soon after, multiple groups of plaintiffs sued, asserting the districts violated Section 2 of the Voting Rights Act of 1965 and the Fourteenth Amendment to the United States Constitution. The plaintiffs sought the creation of an additional majority-minority district. Two suits (Singleton and Milligan) were assigned to a three-judge district court consisting of Judges Stanley Marcus, Terry F. Moorer, and Anna M. Manasco, and the third suit (Caster) was assigned to just Manasco. On January 24, 2022, the district courts in each of the cases enjoined the districts, holding they violated the VRA. The courts did not decide the constitutional issue, applying the doctrine of constitutional avoidance. Alabama appealed the following day to the Supreme Court in Milligan and the United States Court of Appeals for the Eleventh Circuit in Caster.

Supreme Court 

The Supreme Court stayed the district court's injunctions in an order issued on February 7, 2022. The order stated that there was probable jurisdiction from the district court's order in Milligan, and granted certiorari before judgment in Caster. Justice Elena Kagan, joined by Justices Stephen Breyer and Sonia Sotomayor dissented, stating "Today’s decision is one more in a disconcertingly long line of cases in which this Court uses its shadow docket to signal or make changes in the law, without anything approaching full briefing and argument." Chief Justice John Roberts also wrote a dissent to the order to grant a stay, but agreed the Court should review the case.

In response to Kagan's dissent, Justice Brett Kavanaugh wrote a concurrence, joined by Justice Samuel Alito, stating that under Purcell v. Gonzalez, courts should not enjoin enforcement of election-related laws or regulations so close to the election. Again in response, Kagan noted that Alabama "enacted the current map in less than a week and can move quickly again if it wants to", and that their "primary is still four months away, while the general election is nearly nine months away." By contrast, Purcell was decided only 15 days before the 2006 election.

Related cases 

On June 28, 2022, the Supreme Court of the United States granted certiorari and stay to the case Ardoin v. Robinson. This case involved the redistricting of Louisiana, where the Republican Controlled legislature of Louisiana assigned 1 majority black district out of 6 congressional districts despite having a black population of 30%. The Supreme Court granted review in this case but stated that it would hold this case in abeyance pending the decision in Allen.

References 

2023 in United States case law
United States Supreme Court cases
United States Supreme Court cases of the Roberts Court